ROKS Gyeongju (PCC-758) was a  of the Republic of Korea Navy. She was decommissioned and transferred to the Peruvian Coast Guard under the name BAP Ferré (PM-211) in 2016 and later reasigned to the Peruvian Navy as BAP Ferré (CM-27) .

Development and design 

The Pohang class is a series of corvettes built by different Korean shipbuilding companies. The class consists of 24 ships and some after decommissioning were sold or given to other countries. There are five different types of designs in the class from Flight II to Flight VI.

Construction and career 
Gyeongju was launched on 8 June 1984 by Hyundai Heavy Industries in Ulsan. Commissioned on 1 May 1985 and decommissioned on 30 December 2014. An agreement between the Republic of South Korea and the Republic of Peru on October 20, 2015.

She was transferred to the Peruvian Coast Guard under the designation of BAP Ferré (PM-211). The ship arrived at the port of Callao on 15 July 2016, joining the active service of the Directorate of Captaincies and Coast Guard of the Peruvian Navy.

In August 2018, BAP Ferré was reclassified as a missile corvette (CM-27) and incorporated into its Surface Force.

Gallery

References
 

Ships built by Hyundai Heavy Industries Group
Pohang-class corvettes
1984 ships
Corvettes of the Peruvian Navy
Ships of the Peruvian Coast Guard